A Night at Red Rocks with the Colorado Symphony Orchestra is a live album by The Moody Blues, recorded from a live performance at the Red Rocks Amphitheatre on 9 September 1992. This performance was the first time The Moody Blues performed in concert backed by a full orchestra. The concert was held in celebration of the 25th anniversary of their second album, Days of Future Passed, which had featured the London Festival Orchestra. The full video of this concert was broadcast as a fundraising broadcast for PBS in the United States.

The original album was released on 9 March 1993 by Polydor Records, and a Concert Home Video was released shortly after. On 4 March 2003, a deluxe two-disc edition was released, which features the entire concert.

Also, in November 1999, a second video of the concert titled The Other Side of Red Rocks was released. It contained footage of the songs not on the first video release, as well as interviews and rehearsal footage.

Original CD track listing

All songs by Justin Hayward except where noted.

 "Overture" (features excerpts from "Ride My See-Saw", "Tuesday Afternoon (Forever Afternoon)", and "Nights in White Satin") (Hayward, John Lodge) – 2:58
 "Late Lament" (Graeme Edge, Peter Knight) – 1:35
 "Tuesday Afternoon (Forever Afternoon)" – 4:42
 "For My Lady" (Ray Thomas) – 4:11
 "Lean on Me (Tonight)" (Lodge) – 4:39
 "Lovely to See You" – 4:04
 "I Know You're Out There Somewhere" – 5:22
 "The Voice" – 5:28
 "Your Wildest Dreams" – 4:57
 "Isn't Life Strange" (Lodge) – 6:44
 "The Other Side of Life" – 7:05
 "I'm Just a Singer" (Lodge) – 6:55
 "Nights in White Satin" – 6:33
 "Question" – 6:22
 "Ride My See-Saw" (Lodge) – 5:26

Video track listing

 "Overture" – 3:03
 "Late Lament" – 1:21
 "Tuesday Afternoon (Forever Afternoon)" – 4:04 
 "For My Lady" – 4:51
 "New Horizons" – 5:06
 "Lean on Me (Tonight)" – 4:56
 "Lovely to See You" – 4:19
 "Gemini Dream" – 4:20
 "I Know You're Out There Somewhere" – 5:23
 "The Voice" – 5:18
 "Say It with Love" – 3:20 
 "The Story in Your Eyes" – 3:02
 "Your Wildest Dreams" – 4:53
 "Isn't Life Strange" – 7:20
 "The Other Side of Life" – 6:47
 "I'm Just a Singer (In a Rock and Roll Band)" – 6:58 
 "Nights in White Satin" – 6:49
 "Question" – 5:29
 "Ride My See-Saw" – 4:50

Deluxe Edition track listing
The Deluxe Edition was released on 4 March 2003.

Disc one
 "Overture" (features excerpts from "Ride My See-Saw", "New Horizons", "Another Morning", "Voices in the Sky", "(Evening) Time to Get Away", "Isn't Life Strange", "Legend of a Mind", "Tuesday Afternoon (Forever Afternoon)", and "Nights in White Satin") (Hayward, Lodge, Thomas) – 4:53
 "Late Lament" (Edge, Knight) – 1:31
 "Tuesday Afternoon (Forever Afternoon)" – 3:54
 "For My Lady" (Thomas) – 4:55
 "Bless the Wings (That Bring You Back)" – 5:19 
 "Emily's Song" (Lodge) – 4:29
 "New Horizons" – 5:10
 "Lean on Me (Tonight)" (Lodge) – 4:39
 "Voices in the Sky" – 3:44
 "Lovely to See You" – 4:26
 "Gemini Dream" (Hayward, Lodge) – 4:45
 "I Know You're Out There Somewhere"– 5:27
 "The Voice" – 5:53

Disc two
 "Say It with Love" – 4:45
 "The Story in Your Eyes" – 3:36
 "Your Wildest Dreams" – 4:57
 "Isn't Life Strange" (Lodge) – 7:16
 "The Other Side of Life" – 6:02
 "I'm Just a Singer" (Lodge) – 6:47
 "Nights in White Satin" – 6:58
 "Legend of a Mind" (Thomas) – 9:02
 "Question" – 5:51
 "Ride My See-Saw" (Lodge) – 5:04

Personnel 
Justin Hayward – vocals, guitars 
John Lodge – vocals, bass guitar, acoustic guitar
Ray Thomas – vocals, flutes, percussion 
Graeme Edge – drums, percussion

Additional personnel 
Paul Bliss – keyboards
Bias Boshell – keyboards
June Boyce – backing vocals
Sue Shattock – backing vocals 
Gordon Marshall – drums 
Larry Baird & The Colorado Symphony Orchestra.
Recorded by Tom Garneau in the Omega Enterprises Mobile Unit
Mixed by Tom Garneau with Justin Hayward and John Lodge at Vancouver Sound

Charts

Certifications

References 

Collaborative albums
The Moody Blues live albums
1993 live albums
Polydor Records live albums
Albums recorded at Red Rocks Amphitheatre